The Hammer Party is a 1986 release of Big Black's early EPs made between 1982 and 1984. Originally released by Homestead Records, and later rereleased by Touch and Go, the LP came out at the same time as Big Black's Atomizer album, and featured the six songs from Lungs one side and the six songs from Bulldozer. The CD version was expanded to include Big Black's third record, Racer-X.

Track listing
"Steelworker" 1
"Live in a Hole" 1
"Dead Billy" 1
"I Can Be Killed" 1
"Crack" 1
"RIP" 1
"Cables" 2
"Pigeon Kill" 2
"I'm a Mess" 2
"Texas" 2
"Seth" 2
"Jump the Climb" 2
"Racer X" 3
"Shotgun" 3
"The Ugly American" 3
"Deep Six" 3
"Sleep!" 3
"The Big Payback" (James Brown)3

1 Lungs 
2 Bulldozer 
3 Racer-X (CD Only)

Personnel

Steve Albini: guitar and vocals on all tracks
Santiago Durango: guitar on tracks 7-11 and 13-18
Jeff Pezzati: bass on tracks 7-11 and 13-18
 Roland TR-606: drum machine used on all tracks
 Pat Byrne: real drums on tracks 7-11
 John Bonhan: saxophone on tracks 2 and 15

References

External links
The Hammer Party, text from the in sleeve.

Big Black albums
1986 compilation albums
Homestead Records compilation albums
Touch and Go Records compilation albums
Au Go Go Records compilation albums